Antique Olive is a humanist sans-serif typeface ("antique" being equivalent to sans-serif in French typographic conventions).  Along the lines of Gill Sans, it was designed in the early 1960s by French typographer Roger Excoffon, an art director and former consultant to the Marseilles based Fonderie Olive.  In addition to a basic weight, Antique Olive was produced in medium, condensed, wide, bold, condensed bold, extra bold (known as Antique Olive Compact), and ultra bold (known as Nord).  The key shapes, especially the letter O, resemble an olive, which is one of the characteristics which make Excoffon's typefaces unique. It was used in the Sesame Street ending credits from 1978-1983. 

Lewis Blackwell later commented on the design, "An attempt to offer a more refined sans serif than presented by Helvetica and Univers, but it was too characterful and too late to be widely adopted outside France."

The face was later made available in cold type and digital versions are now offered by Adobe Systems and Linotype. A limited set of styles digitized by URW++ are available with GhostPDL (part of the Ghostscript project) under the Aladdin Free Public License.

Kontour Type designed the Utile typeface, inspired from the Antique Olive typeface.

Robert Huber designed the LL Moderne typeface, which based on the Antique Olive typeface.

References

External links
 Antique Olive on MyFonts

Humanist sans-serif typefaces
Letterpress typefaces
Photocomposition typefaces
Digital typefaces
Typefaces and fonts introduced in 1962
Typefaces designed by Roger Excoffon
Fonderie Olive typefaces